HLA-B8 (B8) is an HLA-B serotype. The serotype identifies the  HLA-B*08 gene products. (For terminology help see: HLA-serotype tutorial) HLA-B8, previously known as HL-A8 was one of the first identified of the HLA antigens. It coined the "Super B8" haplotype, also called the ancestral European haplotype because of its common occurrence in Europe, particular the isles and Scandinavia. B8 is a component gene-allele of the AH8.1 haplotype in Northern and Western Europeans. Genes between B8 and DR3 on this haplotype are frequently associated with autoimmune disease.

Serotype

Alleles

References

0